The United States, fighting on the Allied side, contributed to Luxembourg's liberation in World War I and World War II.  More than 5,000 American soldiers, including U.S. Army General George S. Patton, are buried at the Luxembourg American Cemetery and Memorial near the capital of Luxembourg City, and there are monuments in many towns to American liberators. Soldiers from the United States and Luxembourg fought side by side in the Korean War. The strong U.S.–Luxembourg relationship is expressed both bilaterally and through common membership in NATO, the Organisation for Economic Co-operation and Development (OECD), and the Organization for Security and Co-operation in Europe (OSCE).

According to the 2012 U.S. Global Leadership Report, 42% of Luxembourgers approve of U.S. leadership, with 33% disapproving and 25% uncertain.

Officials

 United States Ambassador to Luxembourg: Tom Barrett
 Ambassador of Luxembourg to the United States (concurrently non-resident Ambassador to Canada and Mexico): Jean-Louis Wolzfeld

Embassies and Consulates 
 Embassy of Luxembourg in Washington, D.C.
 Consulate General of Luxembourg in New York
 Consulate General of Luxembourg in San Francisco
 Embassy of the United States in Luxembourg City

Commerce 
 American Chamber of Commerce in Luxembourg

Culture 
  Luxembourg American Cultural Society

The LACS was founded in 2004 by individuals of Luxembourg descent in America as well as citizens of the Grand Duchy of Luxembourg.

Luxembourg Brotherhood of America

Genealogy 
 GENELUX

Immigration from Luxembourg to the United States.
 The Luxembourgers in America

See also 
 Foreign relations of the United States
 Foreign relations of Luxembourg

References

External links
 History of Luxembourg – U.S. relations

 
Bilateral relations of the United States
United States